Sheikh Ahmad Al-Jaber Al-Sabah  (1885 – 29 January 1950) was the tenth ruler of the Sheikhdom of Kuwait from 29 March 1921 until his death on 29 January 1950. He was the longest ruler of Kuwait having reigned for 28 years 305 days

Biography
Ahmad was the son of Jaber II Al-Sabah, who was the eighth ruler of the Sheikhdom of Kuwait between 1915 and 1917. He succeeded his uncle Salem Al-Sabah, the ninth ruler of the Sheikhdom of Kuwait, in February 1921.

Ahmad was the lead cavalry commander, founder of the military of Kuwait and the Directorate of Public Security Force. Ahmad tasked his defense cavalry and infantry to Sheikh Ali Salem Al-Mubarak Al-Sabah in the early 1920s and transferred the command of defense cavalry and infantry to Sheikh Abdullah Jaber Al-Abdullah II Al-Sabah following the 1928 Battle of Al-Regeai. 

In 1936, the Palestinian authorities asked for financial aid from Ahmad Al Jaber, but he refused the demand due to treaty relations that did not permit any dealings with countries apart from Britain. Due to this prevailing condition, Kuwaiti royals and other leading figures were barred from financially assisting the Palestinians. Regardless of these orders, many defied them and in July 1936 200 Iraqi dinars were collected to be sent to Palestine. Later that year in October 1936, leading merchant families in Kuwait formed a seven-man committee to aide the Palestinians and called for a public meeting. The intent was to raise awareness for the ongoing strike in Palestine and to gather funds for support. Al-Sabah, unable to stop this discreetly left town on a hunting trip. 

During his last period of his reign he was the minister of finance from 1940 to 1950.

Personal life
Ahmad was married several times. Notable children include:

 Mohammed Al-Ahmad Al-Jaber Al-Sabah (1909–1975); 1st Defense Minister (1962–1964) to take charge of the Defense portfolio. 
 Jaber Al-Ahmad Al-Jaber Al-Sabah (1926–2006); 13th Ruler and 3rd Emir of Kuwait (1977–2006).
 Sabah Al-Ahmad Al-Jaber Al-Sabah (1929–2020); 15th Ruler and 5th Emir of Kuwait (2006–2020). 
 Nawaf Al-Ahmad Al-Jaber Al-Sabah (born 1937); current Emir of Kuwait; 16th Ruler and 6th Emir of Kuwait (2020–present)
 Mishal Al-Ahmad Al-Jaber Al-Sabah (born 1940), current Crown Prince of Kuwait (2020–present); formerly acting Minister (by protocol designation) and Deputy Commander of Kuwait National Guard.
 Fahad Al-Ahmed Al-Jaber Al-Sabah (1945–1990); commando officer in the Kuwait Armed Forces, killed battling in defense of Dasman Palace.
 Fariha Al-Ahmad Al-Jaber Al-Sabah (1944–2018); philanthropist.

Death
Ahmad died in 1950 at Dasman Palace in Kuwait.

Honors and awards

  Honorary Knight Commander of the Order of the Star of India
  Honorary Knight Commander of the Order of the Indian Empire

See also
Ahmad al-Jaber Air Base

References

External links

20th-century Kuwaiti people
20th-century rulers in Asia
1885 births
1950 deaths
Rulers of Kuwait
Finance ministers of Kuwait
World War II political leaders
House of Al-Sabah
Honorary Knights Commander of the Order of the Star of India
Honorary Knights Commander of the Order of the Indian Empire